Hydromyini is a very large, diverse tribe of muroid rodents in the subfamily Murinae. They are the dominant native rodents in Australasia and one of only two native rodent groups there, the other being the R. fuscipes group of the genus Rattus in the tribe Rattini. They are also found in parts of Southeast Asia.

Taxonomy 
They are thought to be relatively early offshoots from the Murinae, with only Rattini and Phloeomyini being more basal than them. They likely colonized New Guinea (then a part of Sahul) from either the Sunda Shelf or the Philippines during the late Miocene or early Pliocene, about 5 million years ago, and diversified extremely rapidly. From here, they colonized Australia about 2-3 million years ago, undergoing major adaptive radiation.

Earlier taxonomists formerly split this group into three subfamilies (Hydromyinae, Pseudomyinae, and an unnamed "Old Papuan group"). Although all were later merged into the Murinae, they were still retained as multiple tribes (Anisomyini, Hydromyini, Uromyini, and Conilurini), with other taxonomists splitting them even further. However, a 2008 study found them to comprise a single group that had undergone a rapid diversification after colonizing Sahul, and thus placed them all into a single tribe, Hydromyini.

The genus Chiropodomys (formerly placed in a polyphyletic division containing Micromys, Hapalomys, and Vandeleuria) has been found to be the sister group to this tribe, but it has been debated over whether it belongs in its own tribe (Chiropodomyini) or is a basal member of the Hydromyini. The American Society of Mammalogists presently classifies it in Hydromyini.

Although the name "Hydromyini" derives from the semiaquatic type genus Hydromys, which translates directly to "water mouse", only a few members of the tribe such as Hydromys and Xeromys are semiaquatic; the majority are terrestrial, and some such as Notomys are even specifically adapted to arid environments.

Distribution 
Their center of diversity is in New Guinea, with a secondary one in Australia, but they also range east to the Solomon Islands and west to Borneo and the Philippines, and, if the genus Chiropodomys is included, as far west as northeast India. Members of this tribe in New Guinea and Australia are referred to as the "Old Endemic rodents", to differentiate them from the native Rattus species from the tribe Rattini, which colonized the regions much more recently.

Species 
Species in the tribe include:
 Chiropodomys division (sometimes placed in a distinct tribe, Chiropodomyini)
 Genus Chiropodomys - pencil-tailed tree mice
 Palawan pencil-tailed tree mouse, Chiropodomys calamianensis
 Indomalayan pencil-tailed tree mouse, Chiropodomys gliroides
 Koopman's pencil-tailed tree mouse, Chiropodomys karlkoopmani
 Large pencil-tailed tree mouse, Chiropodomys major
 Gray-bellied pencil-tailed tree mouse, Chiropodomys muroides
 Small pencil-tailed tree mouse, Chiropodomys pusillus
 Chrotomys division
 Genus Apomys
 Subgenus Apomys
 Camiguin forest mouse, Apomys camiguinensis
 Mount Apo forest mouse, Apomys hylocoetes
 Mindanao montane forest mouse, Apomys insignis
 Mindanao lowland forest mouse, Apomys littoralis
 Small Luzon forest mouse, Apomys microdon
 Least forest mouse, Apomys musculus
 Subgenus Megapomys
 Luzon Cordillera forest mouse, Apomys abrae
 Luzon Aurora forest mouse, Apomys aurorae
 Mount Banahaw forest mouse, Apomys banahao
 Mount Tapulao forest mouse, Apomys brownorum
 Luzon montane forest mouse, Apomys datae
 Large Mindoro forest mouse, Apomys gracilirostris
 Apomys iridensis
 Mindanao lowland forest mouse, Apomys littoralis
 Apomys lubangensis
 Luzon giant forest mouse, Apomys magnus
 Mount Mingan forest mouse, Apomys minganensis
 Long-nosed Luzon forest mouse, Apomys sacobianus
 Sierra Madre forest mouse, Apomys sierrae
 Luzon Zambales forest mouse, Apomys zambalensis
 Genus Archboldomys (Mount Isarog shrew rats)
 Mount Isarog shrew-mouse, Archboldomys luzonensis
 Large cordillera shrew-mouse, Archboldomys maximus
 Genus Soricomys
 Sierra Madre shrew mouse, Soricomys musseri
 Kalinga shrew mouse, Soricomys kalinga
 Leonardo shrew mouse, Soricomys leonardocoi
 Southern Cordillera shrew-mouse, Soricomys montanus
 Genus Chrotomys - Luzon striped rats
 Luzon striped rat, Chrotomys whiteheadi
 Mindoro striped rat, Chrotomys mindorensis
 Isarog striped shrew-rat, Chrotomys gonzalesi
 Blazed Luzon shrew-rat, Chrotomys silaceus
 Sibuyan striped shrew-rat, Chrotomys sibuyanensis
 Genus Rhynchomys - shrew-like rats
 Banahao shrew-rat, Rhynchomys banahao
 Isarog shrew-rat, Rhynchomys isarogensis
 Labo shrew-rat, Rhynchomys labo
 Mingan shrew-rat, Rhynchomys mingan
 Mount Data shrew-rat, Rhynchomys soricoides
 Tapulao shrew-rat, Rhynchomys tapulao
 Conilurus division
 Genus Conilurus - rabbit rats
 †White-footed rabbit rat, Conilurus albipes
 Brush-tailed rabbit rat, Conilurus penicillatus
 Genus Leporillus - Australian stick-nest rats
 †Lesser stick-nest rat, Leporillus apicalis
 Greater stick-nest rat, Leporillus conditor
 Genus Mesembriomys - tree rats
 Black-footed tree rat, Mesembriomys gouldii
 Golden-backed tree rat, Mesembriomys macrurus
 Haeromys division
 Genus Haeromys - pygmy tree mice
 Ranee mouse, Haeromys margarettae
 Minahassa ranee mouse, Haeromys minahassae
 Lesser ranee mouse, Haeromys pusillus
 Hydromys division
 Genus Baiyankamys (formerly in Hydromys)
 Mountain water rat, Baiyankamys habbema
 Shaw Mayer's water rat, Baiyankamys shawmayeri
 Genus Crossomys (Earless Water Rat)
 Earless water rat, Crossomys moncktoni
 Genus Hydromys - water rats
 Rakali, Hydromys chrysogaster
 Western water rat, Hydromys hussoni
 New Britain water rat, Hydromys neobrittanicus
 Ziegler's water rat, Hydromys ziegleri
 Genus Leptomys
 Leptomys arfakensis
 Long-footed water rat, Leptomys elegans
 Ernst Mayr's water rat, Leptomys ernstmayri
 Leptomys paulus
 Fly River water rat, Leptomys signatus
 Genus Microhydromys
 Southern groove-toothed moss mouse, Microhydromys argenteus
 Northern groove-toothed shrew mouse, Microhydromys richardsoni
 Genus Mirzamys
 Mirza's western moss rat, Mirzamys louiseae
 Mirza's eastern moss rat, Mirzamys norahae
 Genus Parahydromys (Mountain Water Rat)
 New Guinea waterside rat, Parahydromys asper
 Genus Paraleptomys
 Northern water rat, Paraleptomys rufilatus
 Short-haired water rat, Paraleptomys wilhelmina
 Genus Pseudohydromys - New Guinea false water rats
 Bishop moss mouse, Pseudohydromys berniceae
 Huon small-toothed moss mouse, Pseudohydromys carlae
 Laurie's moss mouse, Pseudohydromys eleanorae
 One-toothed shrew mouse, Pseudohydromys ellermani
 Mottled-tailed shrew mouse, Pseudohydromys fuscus
 German's one-toothed moss mouse, Pseudohydromys germani
 Eastern shrew mouse, Pseudohydromys murinus
 Musser's shrew mouse, Pseudohydromys musseri
 Western shrew mouse, Pseudohydromys occidentalis
 Woolley's moss mouse, Pseudohydromys patriciae
 Southern small-toothed moss mouse, Pseudohydromys pumehanae
 White-bellied moss mouse, Pseudohydromys sandrae
 Genus Xeromys (False Water Rat)
 False water rat, Xeromys myoides
 Mallomys division
 Genus Abeomelomys
 Highland brush mouse, Abeomelomys sevia
 Genus Mallomys - giant tree rats
 De Vis's woolly rat, Mallomys aroaensis
 Alpine woolly rat, Mallomys gunung
 Subalpine woolly rat, Mallomys istapantap
 Rothschild's woolly rat, Mallomys rothschildi
 Bosavi woolly rat, Mallomys sp. nov.
 Arfak woolly rat, Mallomys sp. nov.
 Foja woolly rat, Mallomys sp. nov.
 Genus Mammelomys
 Large-scaled mosaic-tailed rat, Mammelomys lanosus
 Large mosaic-tailed rat, Mammelomys rattoides
 Genus Pogonomelomys - Rummler's mosaic tailed rats
 Lowland brush mouse, Pogonomelomys bruijni
 Shaw Mayer's brush mouse, Pogonomelomys mayeri
 Genus Xenuromys (white-tailed New Guinea rats)
 Mimic tree rat, Xenuromys barbatus
 Pogonomys division
 Genus Anisomys (Powerful-toothed Rat)
 Squirrel-toothed rat, Anisomys imitator
 Genus Chiruromys
 Greater tree mouse, Chiruromys forbesi
 Lamia, Chiruromys lamia
 Lesser tree mouse, Chiruromys vates
 Genus Hyomys - white-eared rats
 Western white-eared giant rat, Hyomys dammermani
 Eastern white-eared giant rat, Hyomys goliath
 Genus Lorentzimys (New Guinea jumping mouse)
 New Guinean jumping mouse, Lorentzimys nouhuysi
 Genus Macruromys - New Guinean rats
 Lesser small-toothed rat, Macruromys elegans
 Eastern small-toothed rat, Macruromys major
 Genus Pogonomys - prehensile-tailed rats
 Champion's tree mouse, Pogonomys championi
 D'Entrecasteaux Archipelago tree mouse, Pogonomys fergussoniensis
 Large tree mouse, Pogonomys loriae
 Chestnut tree mouse, Pogonomys macrourus
 Prehensile-tailed rat, Pogonomys mollipilosus
 Gray-bellied tree mouse, Pogonomys sylvestris
 Pseudomys division
 Genus Leggadina
 Forrest's mouse, Leggadina forresti
 Lakeland Downs mouse, Leggadina lakedownensis
 Genus Mastacomys
 Broad-toothed mouse, Mastacomys fuscus
 Genus Notomys - Australian hopping mice
 Spinifex hopping mouse, Notomys alexis
 Short-tailed hopping mouse, Notomys amplus †
 Northern hopping mouse, Notomys aquilo
 Fawn hopping mouse, Notomys cervinus
 Dusky hopping mouse, Notomys fuscus
 Long-tailed hopping mouse, Notomys longicaudatus †
 Big-eared hopping mouse, Notomys macrotis †
 Mitchell's hopping mouse, Notomys mitchellii
 Darling Downs hopping mouse, Notomys mordax †
 Great hopping mouse, Notomys robustus †
 Genus Pseudomys - Australian native mice
 Ash-grey mouse, Pseudomys albocinereus
 Silky mouse, Pseudomys apodemoides
 Plains rat, Pseudomys australis
 Bolam's mouse, Pseudomys bolami
 Kakadu pebble-mound mouse, Pseudomys calabyi
 Western pebble-mound mouse, Pseudomys chapmani
 Little native mouse, Pseudomys delicatulus
 Desert mouse, Pseudomys desertor
 Smoky mouse, Pseudomys fumeus
 Blue-gray mouse, Pseudomys glaucus †
 Gould's mouse, Pseudomys gouldii
 Eastern chestnut mouse, Pseudomys gracilicaudatus
 Sandy inland mouse, Pseudomys hermannsburgensis
 Long-tailed mouse, Pseudomys higginsi
 Central pebble-mound mouse, Pseudomys johnsoni
 Kimberley mouse, Pseudomys (laborifex) johnsoni
 Western chestnut mouse, Pseudomys nanus
 New Holland mouse, Pseudomys novaehollandiae
 Western mouse, Pseudomys occidentalis
 Hastings River mouse, Pseudomys oralis
 Country mouse, Pseudomys patrius
 Pilliga mouse, Pseudomys pilligaensis
 Heath mouse, Pseudomys shortridgei
 Genus Zyzomys - thick-tailed rats
 Common rock rat, Zyzomys argurus
 Arnhem Land rock rat, Zyzomys maini
 Carpentarian rock rat, Zyzomys palatilis
 Central rock rat, Zyzomys pedunculatus
 Kimberley rock rat, Zyzomys woodwardi
 Uromys division
 Genus Melomys - banana rats
 Dusky mosaic-tailed rat, Melomys aerosus
 Rossel Island mosaic-tailed rat, Melomys arcium
 Bannister's rat, Melomys bannisteri
 Bougainville mosaic-tailed rat, Melomys bougainville
 Grassland mosaic-tailed rat, Melomys burtoni
 Cape York mosaic-tailed rat, Melomys capensis
 Fawn-footed mosaic-tailed rat, Melomys cervinipes
 Yamdena mosaic-tailed rat, Melomys cooperae
 Dollman's mosaic-tailed rat, Melomys dollmani
 Manusela mosaic-tailed rat, Melomys fraterculus
 Snow Mountains grassland mosaic-tailed rat, Melomys frigicola
 Seram long-tailed mosaic-tailed rat, Melomys fulgens
 Riama mosaic-tailed rat, Melomys howi
 White-bellied mosaic-tailed rat, Melomys leucogaster
 Papua grassland mosaic-tailed rat, Melomys lutillus
 Manus Island mosaic-tailed rat, Melomys matambuai
 Obi mosaic-tailed rat, Melomys obiensis
 Pavel's Seram mosaic-tailed rat, Melomys paveli
 Bramble Cay mosaic-tailed rat, Melomys rubicola
 Black-tailed mosaic-tailed rat, Melomys rufescens
 Buka Island mosaic-tailed rat, Melomys spechti
 Short-tailed Talaud mosaic-tailed rat, Melomys caurinus
 Long-tailed Talaud mosaic-tailed rat, Melomys talaudium
 Genus Paramelomys
 Gressitt's mosaic-tailed rat, Paramelomys gressitti
 Long-nosed mosaic-tailed rat, Paramelomys levipes
 Lorentz's mosaic-tailed rat, Paramelomys lorentzii
 Thomas's mosaic-tailed rat, Paramelomys mollis
 Moncton's mosaic-tailed rat, Paramelomys moncktoni
 Paramelomys naso (formerly in P. levipes)
 Lowland mosaic-tailed rat, Paramelomys platyops
 Mountain mosaic-tailed rat, Paramelomys rubex
 Paramelomys steini
 Genus Protochromys
 Red-bellied mosaic-tailed rat, Protochromys fellowsi
 Genus Solomys - naked-tailed rats
 Poncelet's giant rat, Solomys ponceleti
 Florida naked-tailed rat, Solomys salamonis
 Bougainville naked-tailed rat, Solomys salebrosus
 Isabel naked-tailed rat, Solomys sapientis
 Buka Island naked-tailed rat, Solomys spriggsarum
 Genus Uromys - giant naked-tailed rats
 Giant naked-tailed rat, Uromys anak
 Biak giant rat, Uromys boeadii
 Giant white-tailed rat, Uromys caudimaculatus
 Emma's giant rat, Uromys emmae
 Masked white-tailed rat, Uromys hadrourus
 Emperor rat, Uromys imperator (possibly extinct)
 Bismarck giant rat, Uromys neobritanicus
 Guadalcanal rat, Uromys porculus (possibly extinct)
 King rat, Uromys rex
 Great Key Island giant rat, Uromys siebersi
 Vangunu giant rat, Uromys vika
 Unknown division
 Genus Brassomys
 White-toothed brush mouse, Brassomys albidens
 Genus Coccymys
 Coccymys kirrhos
 Rümmler's brush mouse, Coccymys ruemmleri
 Coccymys shawmayeri

Threats 
In Australia, many members of this tribe have gone extinct very rapidly since the 19th century due to introduced predators and habitat alteration (such as development and fire suppression). Prominent examples include the white-footed rabbit rat (Conilurus albipes), lesser stick-nest rat (Leporillus apicalis), blue-grey mouse (Pseudomys glaucus) and over half the recent species in the genus Notomys, most of which likely went extinct during the late 19th or early 20th centuries; many other species have also seen significantly reduced populations or range reductions. Genetic studies indicate that many of these species had relatively high genetic diversity prior to European colonization, indicating that they were not suffering from inbreeding beforehand and that high genetic diversity does not shield species from extinctions. Another species, the Bramble Cay melomys (Melomys rubicola), which went extinct in the early 2010s, was the first recorded extinction of an animal due to sea level rise.

References 

Old World rats and mice
Mammal tribes
Taxa named by John Edward Gray